Julian Knowle and Filip Polášek were the defending champions, but Polášek decided not to participate. Knowle played alongside Johan Brunström, but they lost in the quarterfinals to Marcelo Demoliner and Purav Raja.

Jean-Julien Rojer and Horia Tecău won the title, defeating Philipp Marx and Michal Mertiňák in the final, 3–6, 6–4, [10–2].

Seeds

Draw

Draw

References
 Main Draw

PBZ Zagreb Indoors - Doubles
2014 Doubles
2014 PBZ Zagreb Indoors